Danuel Pipoly  (born 11 March 1978) is an American former actor, most famous for starring as Piggy in the 1990 film adaptation of Lord of the Flies. He received two award nominations as a result of his work with Lord of the Flies, including one for best young supporting actor.

Personal life
Pipoly graduated from Crescenta Valley High School in 1996. In 2005 he was single and lived in La Crescenta, California.

Filmography

Awards and nominations

References

External links
 

1978 births
Living people
American male film actors
American male child actors
Male actors from Los Angeles County, California
People from La Crescenta-Montrose, California